Hough Peak is a mountain located in Essex County, New York. 
The mountain, part of the Dix Range, is named after Franklin B. Hough (1822–1885), the first chief of the United States Division of Forestry, and sometimes called the "father of American forestry". 
Hough Peak is flanked to the north by Dix Mountain, and to the south by South Dix.

The east side of Hough Peak drains into the headwaters of the South Fork of the Boquet River, thence into Lake Champlain, which drains into Canada's Richelieu River, the Saint Lawrence River, and into the Gulf of Saint Lawrence.
The west side of Hough Peak drains into Lillian Brook, thence into the East Inlet of Elk Lake, and into The Branch of the Schroon River, the Hudson River, and into New York Bay.

Hough Peak is within the Dix Mountain Wilderness Area of Adirondack State Park.

See also 
 List of mountains in New York
 Northeast 111 4,000-footers 
 Adirondack High Peaks
 Adirondack Forty-Sixers

Notes

External links 
 

Mountains of Essex County, New York
Adirondack High Peaks
Mountains of New York (state)